Three Chopt is a neighborhood in western Richmond, Virginia that is located at the southern terminus of the famous Three Notch'd Road, which in itself serves as a main artery for the community. Located in the West End of the city, the neighborhood is directly to the east of the University of Richmond campus and the suburbs of Westham and Tuckahoe.

See also 
 Neighborhoods of Richmond, Virginia
 Three Notch'd Road
 West End (Richmond, Virginia)

External links 
 Three Chopt map

Neighborhoods in Richmond, Virginia